Bear Inn may refer to:

Bear Inn, a popular Pub name
Bear Inn, Cowbridge, Wales
The Bear, Oxford, England - historically associated with The Bear Inn, Oxford